In Greek mythology, Coryphe (Ancient Greek: Κορυφή) was one of the 3,000 Oceanids, water-nymph daughters of the Titans Oceanus and his sister-wife Tethys. In some versions of the myth, she was the mother by Zeus of the fourth Athena who was called Coria by the Arcadians and worshipped as the inventress of chariots.

Note

References 

 Marcus Tullius Cicero, Nature of the Gods from the Treatises of M.T. Cicero translated by Charles Duke Yonge (1812-1891), Bohn edition of 1878. Online version at the Topos Text Project.
 Marcus Tullius Cicero, De Natura Deorum. O. Plasberg. Leipzig. Teubner. 1917.  Latin text available at the Perseus Digital Library.

Oceanids